Myrmicinae is a subfamily of ants, with about 140 extant genera; their distribution is cosmopolitan. The pupae lack cocoons. Some species retain a functional sting. The petioles of Myrmicinae consist of two nodes. The nests are permanent and in soil, rotting wood, under stones, or in trees.

Identification 
Myrmicine worker ants have a distinct postpetiole, i.e., abdominal segment III is notably smaller than segment IV and set off from it by a well-developed constriction; the pronotum is inflexibly fused to the rest of the mesosoma, such that the promesonotal suture is weakly impressed or absent, and a functional sting is usually present. The clypeus is well-developed; as a result, the antennal sockets are well separated from the anterior margin of the head. Most myrmicine genera possess well-developed eyes and frontal lobes that partly conceal the antennal insertions.

Tribes 
Recently, the number of tribes was reduced from 25 to six:

Attini Smith, 1858
Crematogastrini Forel, 1893
Myrmicini Lepeletier de Saint-Fargeau, 1835
Pogonomyrmecini Ward, Brady, Fisher & Schultz, 2015
Solenopsidini Forel, 1893
Stenammini Ashmead, 1905

Genera 
In 2014, most genera were placed into different tribes or moved to other subfamilies. Below is an updated list:

Attini Smith, 1858
Acanthognathus Mayr, 1887
Acromyrmex Mayr, 1865
Allomerus Mayr, 1878
Apterostigma Mayr, 1865
Atta Fabricius, 1804
†Attaichnus Laza, 1982
Basiceros Schulz, 1906
Blepharidatta Wheeler, 1915
Cephalotes Latreille, 1802
Chimaeridris Wilson, 1989
Colobostruma Wheeler, 1927
Cyatta Sosa-Calvo et al., 2013
Cyphomyrmex Mayr, 1862
Daceton Perty, 1833
Diaphoromyrma Fernández, Delabie & Nascimento, 2009
Epopostruma Forel, 1895
Eurhopalothrix Brown & Kempf, 1961
Ishakidris Bolton, 1984
Kalathomyrmex Klingenberg & Brandão, 2009
Lachnomyrmex Wheeler, 1910
Lenomyrmex Fernández & Palacio, 1999
Mesostruma Brown, 1948
Microdaceton Santschi, 1913
Mycetagroicus Brandão & Mayhé-Nunes, 2001
Mycetarotes Emery, 1913
Mycetophylax Emery, 1913
Mycetosoritis Wheeler, 1907
Mycocepurus Forel, 1893
Myrmicocrypta Smith, 1860
Ochetomyrmex Mayr, 1878
Octostruma Forel, 1912
Orectognathus Smith, 1853
Paramycetophylax Kusnezov, 1956
Phalacromyrmex Kempf, 1960
Pheidole Westwood, 1839
Pilotrochus Brown, 1978
Procryptocerus Emery, 1887
Protalaridris Brown, 1980
Pseudoatta Gallardo, 1916
Rhopalothrix Mayr, 1870
Sericomyrmex Mayr, 1865
Strumigenys Smith, 1860
Talaridris Weber, 1941
Trachymyrmex Forel, 1893
Tranopelta Mayr, 1866
Wasmannia Forel, 1893
Crematogastrini Forel, 1893
Acanthomyrmex Emery, 1893
Adlerzia Forel, 1902
Ancyridris Wheeler, 1935
Atopomyrmex André, 1889
Calyptomyrmex Emery, 1887
Cardiocondyla Emery, 1869
Carebara Westwood, 1840
Cataulacus Smith, 1853
Crematogaster Lund, 1831
Cyphoidris Weber, 1952
Dacatria Rigato, 1994
Dacetinops Brown & Wilson, 1957
Dicroaspis Emery, 1908
Dilobocondyla Santschi, 1910
Diplomorium Mayr, 1901
†Enneamerus Mayr, 1868
†Eocenomyrma Dlussky & Radchenko, 2006
Eutetramorium Emery, 1899
Formicoxenus Mayr, 1855
Formosimyrma Terayama, 2009
Gauromyrmex Menozzi, 1933
Gaoligongidris Xu, 2012
Harpagoxenus Forel, 1893
Huberia Forel, 1890
†Hypopomyrmex Emery, 1891
Indomyrma Brown, 1986
Kartidris Bolton, 1991
Lasiomyrma Terayama & Yamane, 2000
Leptothorax Mayr, 1855
Liomyrmex Mayr, 1865
†Lonchomyrmex Mayr, 1867
Lophomyrmex Emery, 1892
Lordomyrma Emery, 1897
Malagidris Bolton & Fisher, 2014
Mayriella Forel, 1902
Melissotarsus Emery, 1877
Meranoplus Smith, 1853
Metapone Forel, 1911
Myrmecina Curtis, 1829
Myrmisaraka Bolton & Fisher, 2014
Nesomyrmex Wheeler, 1910
Ocymyrmex Emery, 1886
†Oxyidris Wilson, 1985
†Parameranoplus Wheeler, 1915
Paratopula Wheeler, 1919
Perissomyrmex Smith, 1947
Peronomyrmex Viehmeyer, 1922
Podomyrma Smith, 1859
Poecilomyrma Mann, 1921
Pristomyrmex Mayr, 1866
Proatta Forel, 1912
Propodilobus Branstetter, 2009
Recurvidris Bolton, 1992
Rhopalomastix Forel, 1900
Romblonella Wheeler, 1935
Rostromyrmex Rosciszewski, 1994
Rotastruma Bolton, 1991
Royidris Bolton & Fisher, 2014
Secostruma Bolton, 1988
Stereomyrmex Emery, 1901
†Stigmomyrmex Mayr, 1868
†Stiphromyrmex Wheeler, 1915
Strongylognathus Mayr, 1853
Temnothorax Mayr, 1861
Terataner Emery, 1912
Tetheamyrma Bolton, 1991
Tetramorium Mayr, 1855
Trichomyrmex Mayr, 1865
Vitsika Bolton & Fisher, 2014
Vollenhovia Mayr, 1865
Vombisidris Bolton, 1991
Xenomyrmex Forel, 1885
Myrmicini Lepeletier de Saint-Fargeau, 1835
Manica Jurine, 1807
Myrmica Latreille, 1804
†Plesiomyrmex Dlussky & Radchenko, 2009
†Protomyrmica Dlussky & Radchenko, 2009
Pogonomyrmecini Ward, Brady, Fisher & Schultz, 2014
Hylomyrma Forel, 1912
Pogonomyrmex Mayr, 1868
Solenopsidini Forel, 1893
Adelomyrmex Emery, 1897
Anillomyrma Emery, 1913
Austromorium Shattuck, 2009
Baracidris Bolton, 1981
Bariamyrma Lattke, 1990
Bondroitia Forel, 1911
Cryptomyrmex Fernández, 2004
Dolopomyrmex Cover & Deyrup, 2007
Epelysidris Bolton, 1987
Kempfidris Fernández, Feitosa & Lattke, 2014
Megalomyrmex Forel, 1885
Monomorium Mayr, 1855
Myrmicaria Saunders, 1842
Oxyepoecus Santschi, 1926
Rogeria Emery, 1894
Solenopsis Westwood, 1840
Stegomyrmex Emery, 1912
Syllophopsis Santschi, 1915
Tropidomyrmex Silva, Feitosa, Brandão & Diniz, 2009
Tyrannomyrmex Fernández, 2003
Stenammini Ashmead, 1905
Aphaenogaster Mayr, 1853
Goniomma Emery, 1895
Messor Forel, 1890
Novomessor Emery, 1915
Oxyopomyrmex André, 1881
†Paraphaenogaster Dlussky, 1981
Stenamma Westwood, 1839
Veromessor Forel, 1917
incertae sedis
†Afromyrma Dlussky, Brothers & Rasnitsyn, 2004
†Agastomyrma Dlussky, Rasnitsyn & Perfilieva, 2015
†Bilobomyrma Radchenko & Dlussky, 2013
†Biamomyrma Dlussky, Rasnitsyn & Perfilieva, 2015
†Boltonidris Radchenko & Dlussky, 2012
†Brachytarsites Hong, 2002
†Cephalomyrmex Carpenter, 1930
†Clavipetiola Hong, 2002
†Electromyrmex Wheeler, 1910
†Eocenidris Wilson, 1985
†Eomyrmex Hong, 1974
†Fallomyrma Dlussky & Radchenko, 2006
†Fushunomyrmex Hong, 2002
†Ilemomyrmex Wilson, 1985
†Miosolenopsis Zhang, 1989
†Myrmecites Dlussky & Rasnitsyn, 2003
†Orbigastrula Hong, 2002
†Quadrulicapito Hong, 2002
†Quineangulicapito Hong, 2002
†Sinomyrmex Hong, 2002
†Solenopsites Dlussky & Rasnitsyn, 2003
†Sphaerogasterites Hong, 2002
†Wumyrmex Hong, 2002
†Zhangidris Bolton, 2003

References

External links 
 
 

 
Ant subfamilies
Turonian first appearances
Extant Turonian first appearances